The following are some of the concept cars that have been made by the Italian Alfa Romeo company.

References